"Better Than Me" is the fourth single released from Hinder's debut album, Extreme Behavior (2005). This song was #66 on MTV Asias list of Top 100 Hits of 2007.

Critical reception
Billboard magazine called the single "smaller and less bombastic, but [as] equally infectious" as "Lips of an Angel".

Music video
The music video for the song starts with the band playing in a dark room, then shows a dysfunctional young couple at their home. The young man buys meth from a drug dealer in a pickup truck. While looking at pictures of him and his girlfriend together, he cracks open a light bulb with a knife, pours the meth into it, and heats it on a stove. After ingesting the meth, he has a violent, painful reaction to it, suffering a seizure and itching all over his body. His girlfriend walks in and begins to confront him. He starts to throw things at her. The lights of the room the band was in are turned on and it is revealed to be a cathedral. The funeral of the young man seen earlier is in progress, and it is clear that he died from an overdose. The girlfriend rushes forward, in tears, to his casket and puts an envelope into his hands after being stopped by her best friend.

A contest was held on YouTube challenging aspiring directors to create their own video for the song with the reward being the video being shown on television as well as an unpaid job as an assistant on the set of the official video. Ironically, while the winner was not shown on television, most of the entries involved similar subject matter to the official video, with very few entries not revolving around drug addiction and only a few not ending in suicide by overdose.

Charts

Weekly charts

Year-end charts

Release history

References

2005 songs
2007 singles
Hinder songs
Rock ballads
Songs written by Brian Howes
Universal Republic Records singles